Clint Wilder is a business journalist who has covered the high-tech and clean-tech industries since 1985.

Biography 

Clint Wilder is senior editor at Clean Edge, a clean-tech research and strategy firm in the San Francisco Bay Area and Portland, Oregon, where he coauthors reports and writes columns on industry trends and has been a facilitator at the Clinton Global Initiative. He is a frequent speaker at clean-energy and green business events in the U.S. and overseas, and a regular blogger for the Huffington Post. In 2002, Mr. Wilder won the American Society of Business Publications Editors award for best feature series. He is also co-author of The Clean Tech Revolution: The Next Big Growth and Investment Opportunity, published in June 2007, which has been translated into seven languages.

Wilder's forthcoming book is Clean Tech Nation: How the U.S. Can Lead in the New Global Economy (HarperCollins, September 2012).

See also

Ron Pernick
Joel Makower

References

External links
Extinction or Innovation? U.S. Government Must Enact Clean Energy Policy

People associated with solar power
Living people
Non-fiction environmental writers
Sustainability advocates
Year of birth missing (living people)